Burness Corlett Three Quays is a maritime consulting company.  It was formed in 2005 from the merger of Burness Corlett and Partners (BCP) and Three Quays Marine Services (TQMS) (TKMS).  From three office locations in the UK mainland and also IOM, Dubai and Sydney, BCTQ handle projects as varied as roll-on roll-off, cargo, oil and gas, wind-farm support, defense and port systems, large commercial passenger vessels, and private luxury yachts.

Dr ECB Corlett, OBE, FREng established what would become BCP in 1952, based first in London,  later in Basingstoke. BCP carried out marine surveys and structural examinations on many ship types, including stern trawlers, cable ships, container ships, liquid natural gas tankers, and passenger ferries. Corlett was fascinated with Isambard Kingdom Brunel's SS Great Britain; in 1967 he wrote to The Times to raise public interest in the plight of the ship which, at the time, was lying bottomed in a wrecked condition in Sparrow Cove, Falkland Islands. The ship was subsequently restored.

Before the merger, Three Quays Marine Services was the technical services division of P&O, responsible for the design and development of P&O's fleet of passenger and cargo vessels and associated products and services.

References

External links 
 

Consulting firms established in 2005